Robert Bateman may refer to:

People 
 Robert Bateman (artist) (1842–1922), English painter, sculptor, naturalist, and scholar
 Robert Bateman (MP) (1560–1644), English merchant and politician
 Robert Bateman (painter) (born 1930), Canadian wildlife artist and naturalist
 Robert James Bateman (1860–1912), American pastor who died on the RMS Titanic
 Robert Bateman (songwriter) (1936–2016), American musician and songwriter

Schools 
 Robert Bateman High School (est. 2005), Burlington, Ontario, Canada
 Robert Bateman Secondary School (est. 1993), Abbotsford, British Columbia, Canada

Bateman, Robert